USS Whistler (SP-784) was a United States Navy patrol vessel in commission from 1917 to 1919.

Whistler was built as a private motorboat of the same name by J. E. Graves at Marblehead, Massachusetts, in 1917. On 17 May 1917, the U.S. Navy acquired her from her owner, Lawrence F. Percival of Boston, Massachusetts, for use as a section patrol boat during World War I. She was commissioned as USS Whistler (SP-784) on 31 July 1917.

Assigned to the Boston Section of the 1st Naval District, Whistler operated from the naval districts headquarters at the Commonwealth Pier in Boston on harbor entrance patrols for the rest of World War I. She occasionally served as a dispatch boat, carrying messages to and from other boats patrolling the harbor entrance.  She also stood by the new submarine USS O-5 (Submarine No. 66) while O-5 conducted pre-commissioning submergence and sea trials on 30 May 1918.

Whistler was decommissioned on 19 May 1919 and stricken from the Navy List the same day. She was sold to J. E. Doherty of Boston on 20 June 1919.

References

Department of the Navy Naval History and Heritage Command Online Library of Selected Images: Civilian Ships: Whistler (Motor Boat, 1917). Served as USS Whistler (SP-784) in 1917-1919
NavSource Online: Section Patrol Craft Photo Archive Whistler (SP 784)

Patrol vessels of the United States Navy
World War I patrol vessels of the United States
Ships built in Marblehead, Massachusetts
1917 ships